Alexander Martin Clunes OBE DL (born 28 November 1961) is an English actor, comedian, director and television presenter. He is best known for portraying Martin Ellingham in the ITV comedy-drama series Doc Martin and Gary Strang in Men Behaving Badly. Clunes has narrated a number of documentaries for ITV, the first of which was Islands of Britain in 2009. He has since presented a number of documentaries centred on animals.  He has also voiced Kipper the Dog in the animated series Kipper.

Clunes was appointed an Officer of the Order of the British Empire (OBE) in the 2015 Birthday Honours for services to drama, charity and the community in Dorset.

Early life
Clunes was born on 28 November 1961 in Wimbledon, London, the son of actor Alec Clunes and his second wife, Daphne  ( Acott) Clunes (4 July 1928 — 17 September 2007). Clunes was educated at the Royal Russell School in Croydon, and later at the Arts Educational Schools, London. He has an older sister Amanda. Clunes is related to actor Jeremy Brett, who was variously described as either Clunes' uncle or cousin. 

Alec Clunes died in 1970 of lung cancer when his son was eight years old.

Career
Clunes served his first role in rep at the Mercury Theatre, Colchester, and his first television appearance was in an adaptation of Mikhail Bulgakov's The White Guard for the BBC Play of the Month in 1982, followed by the Doctor Who story Snakedance in 1983. A sporadic career led to his supplementing his income as a photo model for Gilbert and George, and he can be seen in their 1983 work World. He got his first regular television role as one of the sons in the BBC sitcom No Place Like Home, and then starred in two series of the sitcom All at No 20.

While Clunes was appearing on stage at the Hampstead Theatre, Harry Enfield came to see him; the acquaintanceship developed into a friendship where Clunes played characters in Enfield's sketch shows (most notably one of the Rugby Players). Enfield then recommended Clunes for the role of Gary in the sitcom Men Behaving Badly, written for Enfield by Simon Nye, for which Clunes won a BAFTA television award for Best Comedy Performance in 1996. He played the part of Group Captain Barker in the two-part TV mini-series Over Here that same year. In 1993, he played Dick Dobson in Demob about a pair of demobilised soldiers who have to adjust to civilian life after entertaining Second World War troops with a raunchy cabaret act.

Since 1994, Clunes has frequently appeared on the BBC One panel show Have I Got News for You as a panelist or a guest presenter. Clunes has since appeared in films and television shows such as An Evening with Gary Lineker, Staggered (starred and directed), Hunting Venus, The Booze Cruise, Saving Grace and Jeeves and Wooster. In 1998, he was featured in Sweet Revenge and appeared as Richard Burbage in the film Shakespeare in Love. Clunes has also acted frequently for the radio, including a guest appearance in the BBC Radio 4 series Baldi.

In 2001, he played Captain Stickles in the BBC adaptation of R. D. Blackmore's Lorna Doone. In 2002, Clunes played serial killer John George Haigh in a Yorkshire TV production A Is for Acid, and took the lead in ITV's production of Goodbye Mr Chips. Clunes was one of the eponymous leads in the 2004 ITV comedy-drama William and Mary, with Julie Graham. Clunes had worked with Julie Graham previously on Dirty Tricks (2000). Since 2004, Clunes has played the lead role of Doctor Martin Ellingham in the ITV comedy drama series Doc Martin. In August 2007, Clunes starred in the ITV/TVNZ co-production The Man Who Lost His Head.

Clunes is a regular voice-over artist and is the voice of Kipper in the animated children's series Kipper the Dog. For six years (1993–1999) he also did voice acting for Safeway adverts; he provided the voice of Harry in Safeway's 'When Harry Met Molly' advertising campaign during said years. Clunes appeared in a television dramatisation of Fungus the Bogeyman playing Jessica White's father. Between 2009 and 2010, Clunes starred on BBC One television in the title role of Reggie Perrin, a re-make of classic 1970s British situation comedy The Fall and Rise of Reginald Perrin. In 2015, Clunes played the role of Sir Arthur Conan Doyle in the ITV mini-series Arthur & George. In 2018, Clunes played the role of DCI Colin Sutton in the ITV drama Manhunt (first screened in 2019). In 2019, Clunes return to sitcom with the BBC1 series Warren, saying "It was just so funny, I couldn't turn it down".

Film
Clunes played Brock in the 1990 film The Russia House. He played a character called Martin in the 1992 film Carry On Columbus; Richard Burbage in the 1998 film Shakespeare in Love; and Anthony Staxton-Billing in Sweet Revenge the same year. In 2000, Clunes played the role of Dr. Martin Bamford in the film Saving Grace, and the follow up to that film Doc Martin the following year (2001), he played James Chancellor in Global Heresy.

In 2011, Clunes voiced the mischievous dog Dudley in the short film Me or the Dog, starring Edward Hogg and directed by Abner Pastoll. Clunes then starred in the 2014 film Nativity 3: Dude, Where's My Donkey?.

Documentaries
In 2008, Clunes presented Martin Clunes: A Man and his Dogs, which was aired on 24 August 2008.
In 2009, Clunes presented a three-part ITV series Islands of Britain, which saw him travelling around several of the country's lesser known islands. In 2010 Clunes presented ITV mini-series Horsepower about man's relationship over time with the horse. This was followed by Heavy Horsepower which aired in 2013. In January 2011, Clunes presented documentary Martin Clunes: Man to Manta. In June 2012 Clunes presented a documentary series on ITV about the lemurs of Madagascar called Martin Clunes: The Lemurs of Madagascar.

On 31 January 2013, Clunes narrated ITV documentary Secret Life of Dogs. Then, on 2 and 3 June 2014, he narrated two more follow-up documentaries, Secret Life of Cats and Secret Life of Babies. On 4 April 2014 Clunes hosted a one-off ITV documentary called Martin Clunes & A Lion Called Mugie, following the work of conservationists in Kenya as well as tracking the progress of a lion called Mugie. The documentary was filmed over a period of three years. In August 2014 Clunes narrated ITV's three-part documentary series Kids with Cameras: Diary of a Children's Ward which saw Newcastle's children's ward through the eyes of its patients. In April 2015 Clunes narrated Carry on Forever, a three part documentary series for ITV3. It was shown over the Easter weekend.

In May 2015, Clunes presented Man & Beast with Martin Clunes, a two-part factual series for ITV, which looked at the relationship between humans and animals. In 2016, he narrated Rising Damp Forever, a two-part documentary series for ITV3. He also voiced ITV programmes Secrets of Growing Old, Secrets of Growing Up and Britain's Favourite Dogs. Also in 2016, Martin Clunes: Islands of Australia (also known as Islands of Oz) was released as a three-part Australian documentary television series produced by Prospero Productions for the Seven Network that "follows acclaimed actor and comedian Martin Clunes as he explores the most diverse, intriguing, remote and spectacular islands that surround Australia." In 2019, Martin Clunes: Islands of America was released as a four-part documentary where he traveled to remote islands across the United States.

Personal life
Clunes's first marriage was to actress Lucy Aston in 1990. They divorced in 1997 and Clunes married future Doc Martin producer Philippa Braithwaite late that year.In 1999, Braithwaite gave birth to their daughter Emily. , Clunes and his family live in Beaminster, Dorset, where they run a farm with heavy horses.

Traffic offences 
In 1995, Clunes was fined £350 for being about 1.5 times the legal limit for alcohol while driving. In 2012, he was dropped from an advertising role with Churchill's Insurance after amassing 12 points on his licence for four separate speeding offences, which also led to his being suspended from driving.

Charity
A sponsor of numerous charities, Clunes made a short on-line film with Stephen Fry about HIV discrimination for the Terrence Higgins Trust. 

Clunes supports Weldmar Hospicecare Trust in Dorset and is a Patron of Julia's House, the Dorset and Wiltshire children's hospice. The Buckham Fair is organised in support of these charities. In January 2011, Clunes became a patron of Animal Care in Egypt (ACE).

Clunes was a patron of the Born Free Foundation, and had filmed several adverts for the charity. However, he was dropped by the foundation in May 2019, after he was filmed riding an elephant in an episode of the ITV documentary series My Travels with Other Animals. He has also been involved in the Comic Relief charity which funds Survival International and African Initiatives, two organisations working with the Maasai on indigenous land rights issues. He is a celebrity supporter of The Dog Rescue Federation.

Filmography
Television

Film

Awards
1995 – British Comedy Awards, Top TV Comedy Actor : Men Behaving Badly – Gary Strang
1996 – BAFTA Awards, Best Comedy Performance : Men Behaving Badly – Gary Strang
1999 – Screen Actors Guild Awards, Outstanding Performance by a Cast : Shakespeare in Love – Richard Burbage

Honours
Clunes was made an Officer of the Order of the British Empire (OBE) in the Civil Division on 13 June 2015 in the 2015 Queen's Birthday Honours List. He was appointed as a Deputy Lieutenant (DL) of the County of Dorset on 19 June 2019.

Bournemouth University awarded him the honorary degree of Doctor of Arts (D.Arts) on 9 November 2007. He has been president of the British Horse Society since 1 June 2011.

References

External links 
 

1961 births
Living people
20th-century English male actors
21st-century English male actors
Best Comedy Performance BAFTA Award (television) winners
British male comedy actors
Deputy Lieutenants of Dorset
Doc Martin
English broadcasters
English male film actors
English male television actors
English male voice actors
English television personalities
English television presenters
Film directors from London
Male actors from London
Officers of the Order of the British Empire
Outstanding Performance by a Cast in a Motion Picture Screen Actors Guild Award winners
People educated at the Arts Educational Schools
People educated at Royal Russell School
People from Wimbledon, London